Frederick Enaholo (born 12 March 1971) is a Swedish former footballer.

Early life
Frederick Enaholo was born to a Serbian mother and Nigerian father. He started his football career in Vojvodina Novi Sad.

Playing career
In 1992, Enaholo arrived in Sweden and trialed with Malmö FF. He did not succeed and instead he joined IFK Trelleborg and later Trelleborgs FF in 1995. He made his Allsvenskan debut on 9 April in a 0–0 draw against Örebro SK. He ended his career in IFK Malmö.

References

Swedish people of Serbian descent
1971 births
Living people
Swedish footballers
Swedish people of Nigerian descent
Association football goalkeepers
Allsvenskan players
FK Vojvodina players
Trelleborgs FF players
IFK Malmö Fotboll players